Chandola Homoeopathic Medical College & Hospital (CHMC&H) is a Homoeopathic institute located at Rudrapur in state of Uttarakhand, India. It is affiliated with Uttarakhand Ayurved University.

History
The college was established since 2002 and it has been run by Chandola Educational Trust and managed by Managing Trustee Dr. K. C. Chandola.

Courses
 Bachelor of Homoeopathic Medicine & Surgery (B. H. M. S.)
 MD

Academic facilities
 Department of Anatomy
 Department of Biochemistry
 Department of Community Medicine
 Department of F. M. T.
 Department of Obst. & Gyn.
 Department of Physiology
 Department of Pathology & Microbiology
 Department of Pharmacy
 Department of Practice of Medicine
 Department of Homeopathic Materia Medica
 Department of Homeopathic Repertory & Case Taking
 Department of Organon of Medicine
 Department of Surgery

Hospital
Homoeopathic hospital provides facilities for imparting practical and clinical skills to make the clinical studies self-reliant, which confident to understand the clinical problem and diagnose with accuracy, prescribed a rational medication. Clinical medical, surgical & diagnostic facilities are available in the hospital.

 Outdoor Patient Department:
 Indoor Patient Department:
The college is running a 30-bedded well-equipped I. P. D. with Medicine, Surgery Gynaecology & Obstetrics & Pediatric Wards. There is facility to handle all types of clinical cases.

References

Medical colleges in Uttarakhand
Education in Udham Singh Nagar district
Educational institutions established in 2002
2002 establishments in Uttarakhand
Homeopathic colleges